Abbasabad (also Romanized as ‘Abbāsābād; also known as Dastjerd-e ‘Abbāsābād) is a village in Nazluy-ye Jonubi Rural District, in the Central District of Urmia County, West Azerbaijan Province, Iran. At the 2006 census, its population was 60, in 19 families.

References 

Populated places in Urmia County